Pontell is a surname. Notable people with the surname include:

Henry Pontell (born 1950), American sociologist
Jonathan Pontell (born 1950), American television director, producer, and editor

See also
Montell